This article lists the British representatives in the Raj of Sarawak from 1888 to 1946. They were responsible for representing British interests in the Raj of Sarawak during the period of a British protectorate (from 14 June 1888 to 1 July 1946), until the country was ceded to the United Kingdom and became the Crown Colony of Sarawak.

List

(Dates in italics indicate de facto continuation of office)

See also
 White Rajahs
 Raj of Sarawak
 History of Sarawak

References

External links

Government of Sarawak
History of Sarawak
Kingdom of Sarawak
Malaysia and the Commonwealth of Nations
United Kingdom and the Commonwealth of Nations
Malaysia diplomacy-related lists